Helen Richey (November 21, 1909 – January 7, 1947) was a pioneering female aviator and the first woman to be hired as a pilot by a commercial airline in the United States.

In 1933, she and her flying partner, Frances Harrell Marsalis, set a women's fueling endurance record of 237 hours and 42 minutes above the city of Miami in their airplane, the "Flying Boudoir." 

Three years later, Richey set a women's international light plane record of 100 kilometers traveled in 55 minutes. As a co-pilot in the Bendix race that same year with Amelia Earhart, she secured the women's light plane altitude record. During World War II, Richey became the first female pilot from Pittsburgh, Pennsylvania at the war front in Europe.

Formative years
Born in McKeesport, Pennsylvania on November 21, 1909, Helen Richey was a daughter of Joseph Burdette Richey (1865-1947), the superintendent of schools in McKeesport from 1902 to 1935, and Amy Seal (Winter) Richey (1872-1943). She and her siblings, Dewayne Greenwood Richey (1892-1940), Amy Lucile (Richey) Gamble (1893-1977), Martha (Richey) Smith (1900-1981), and Joseph Winter Richey (1907-1976), spent many of their formative years in McKeesport.

A 1927 graduate of McKeesport High School, Helen Richey was one of the few girls in McKeesport who wore pants during her teen years. She learned how to fly a plane at age 20. Her father subsequently bought her a Bird plane when she obtained her pilot's license.

Aviation career
In December 1933 Richey partnered with another female pilot, Frances Marsalis, to set an endurance record by staying airborne for nearly 10 days over Miami, Florida, with midair refueling. Their aircraft was a Curtiss Thrush, named "Outdoor Girl" after its sponsor, a cosmetics brand. Marsalis had previously set an endurance record the previous year with Louise Thaden in another Thrush.  The refuelling was achieved by opening the central hatch, grabbing a dangling hose out of a Curtiss Robin and shoving it into the gas tank, which Richey likened to "wrestling with a cobra in a hurricane". Marsalis was killed during the 1934 Women's Air Meet in Dayton.

In 1934 Richey won the premier air race at the first National Air Meet for women in Dayton, Ohio. Also in 1934, Central Airlines, a Greensburg, Pennsylvania–based carrier that eventually became part of United Airlines, hired Richey as a pilot; she made her first regular civil flight with them on December 31, taking a Ford Trimotor on the Washington to Detroit route. She eventually was forced to step down from the cockpit by the all-male pilots union.

In May 1936, Helen Richey, flying a light plane, set an international altitude record for aircraft weighing under . She reached  during a flight from Congressional Airport to Endless Caverns Airport in New Market, Virginia. Richey flew the same plane that Benjamin King had flown to break the record previously.

After leaving Central Airlines, Richey continued to perform at air shows. In 1936 she teamed with Amelia Earhart in a transcontinental air race, the Bendix Trophy Race. Richey and Earhart came in fifth, beating some all-male teams. Later, Richey flew with the British Air Transport Auxiliary during World War II.

After a year of ferrying British airplanes, Richey resigned from her Air Transport position on March 31, 1943, and returned home to McKeesport to be closer to her ailing mother, saying, "I felt mother needed me."

On September 11, 1943, Richey and professional golfer Helen Detweiler were awarded their Army Air Force wings at Avenger Field in Sweetwater, Texas during a ceremony presided over by Jacqueline Cochran. Three weeks later, her mother died at their McKeesport home on October 2. 

In 1944, Richey was a member of the Women Airforce Service Pilots (WASPs) and was stationed at the New Castle Army Air Base in Delaware, where she was responsible for ferrying military planes to and from Canada.

In addition to being the first female commercial airline pilot, Richey also was the first woman sworn in to pilot air mail and one of the first female flight instructors.

Accident and injury
Sometime during late May or early June of 1945, Richey injured her spine during an airplane accident.  She spent several weeks recuperating at a private hospital in New York. Her sister, Amy, subsequently claimed that reports of Helen's accident and injury were untrue.

Death, funeral and interment
Richey died in her apartment in New York City on January 7, 1947, apparently from a pill overdose. Her death was ruled a suicide. The Richmond Times-Dispatch and The Montana Standard reported that she had been under the care of a physician for depression at the time of her death.

Her funeral was held in her hometown of McKeesport, Pennsylvania on January 10, 1947, and she was then interred at that community's Versailles Cemetery.

References 
Notes

Citations

Bibliography

External links
 Belser, Ann. (2006, September 7). Historic McKeesport aviator to be profiled in documentary. Pittsburgh Post-Gazette
Helen Richey biography at San Diego Air & Space Museum
"Helen Richey: First Female Airline Pilot" at Women In Aviation Resource Center
Helen Richey Collection at San Diego Air & Space Museum Archives
"Trilogy of Tales: Forgotten Pittsburghers". Pittsburgh Oddcast 

People from McKeesport, Pennsylvania
1909 births
1947 suicides
Drug-related suicides in New York City
Flight endurance record holders
Commercial aviators
American aviation record holders
American women commercial aviators
Aviators from Pennsylvania
American flight instructors
American women flight instructors
American women aviation record holders
Suicides in New York City
Drug-related deaths in New York City
20th-century American women
1947 deaths
20th-century American people